Tatyana Khramova (born 1 February 1970) is a Belarusian athlete. She competed in the women's high jump at the 1996 Summer Olympics.

References

1970 births
Living people
Athletes (track and field) at the 1996 Summer Olympics
Belarusian female high jumpers
Olympic athletes of Belarus
Place of birth missing (living people)